H&W may refer to:

 Harland and Wolff, a British  shipyard company
 Hereford and Worcester, a former English county
 Hartmann & Weiss